Donald D. Hennies (born c. 1937) is an American politician from South Dakota who represented the 13th district in the South Dakota House of Representatives from 2001 to 2003, alongside Phyllis Heineman.

Political career
Don Hennies won election to the South Dakota House of Representatives in November 2000, and was sworn in on January 2, 2001. He was appointed to the taxation and transportation committees shortly before taking office. In February 2001, Hennies spoke out against increased taxation on tobacco products.

Personal
Outside of politics, Heenies worked as an engineer and construction manager. His older brother Ron was an Episcopalian priest. A younger brother, Tom, was a member of the South Dakota House of Representatives from 1999 to 2006.

References

1930s births
Living people
Republican Party members of the South Dakota House of Representatives
21st-century American politicians